Karaiyellam Shenbagapoo is a 1981 Indian Tamil-language thriller film directed by G. N. Rangarajan, starring Pratap Pothen and Sripriya. It is based on Sujatha's novel of the same name. The film was released on 14 August 1981.

Plot 
C. Kalyanaraman a young man comes to a village from the town to collect village songs for his research. There, he meets a village girl named Velli who helps him to carry his luggage. Velli and her cousin Maruthamuththu are in love with each other, hoping to marry soon. Kalyanaraman stays in an abandoned old bungalow of the village Zamindar's, arranged by a village head man called Thangarasu. The Zamindar is now dead and their children live in far away towns with no connections with the village. Thangarasu tells Kalyanaraman about an old woman named Periyaththa who sings village songs well. On the first day, Kalyanaraman wanders around the big bungalow, witnessing old photographs of the Zamindar and his wife. On the upper floor, he finds a newly smoked cigarette which confuses him, as the bungalow has been abandoned for many years. On the night of the first day, Kalyanaraman hears someone is walking on the top floor, but cannot find who it is.

From the next day Kalyanaraman starts to collect village songs from many villagers. Periyaththa, the old woman is brought to the Bungalow by Thangarasu. Thangarasu warns Kalyanaraman about Periyaththa, that she gossips a lot and has a habit of stealing things. She sings songs for Kalyanaraman and gets money from him. Kalyanaraman goes to the nearby town to buy things with Maruthamuththu by his tractor. One day, a modern girl tries to stop the tractor for a lift. But, she is unnoticed by them. After coming back to the Bungalow, Raman again goes to the top floor and checks. There he finds an old cupboard which has old books inside it. When he is checking the books, he is shocked by a voice behind him. It is the girl, who tried asking for lift. She introduces herself as Snehalatha. Thangarasu is also present there, telling him that she is the daughter of the Zamindar's last son. She tells Raman that she has come just for spending her vacation. Raman wants to search for another place to stay. But Snehalatha tells him not to go as he is a guest of hers. She stays in another room of the Bungalow. Maruthamuththu starts helping Snehalatha and introduces her to Velli also. On that night, Maruthamuththu also stays outside of the Bungalow for their safety. In the middle of the night, Raman is waken up by a strange sound again and he goes out and wakes up Maruthamuththu. They both go and check and suddenly someone runs out of the bungalow, but they fail to catch.

From the following days Kalyanaraman focuses on collecting songs and he trains a group of children including Velli's younger brother for a group song. Meanwhile, Snehalatha gets close with Maruthamuththu, which makes Velli angry. One day when Raman is checking for the book cupboard, he finds a diary written by Rathnavathi Devi, the wife of the Zamindar. He shows it to Snehalatha, and Snehalatha grabs the diary, refuses to give it back to him and tells him that she cannot allow an outsider to read her family diary. When investigating about Rathnavadidevi from Periyaththa, she tells him the story of Innocent Rathnavadi Devi and how the Zamindar, who is a womaniser tortured her. She also confesses that once the Zamindar tried to molest her, but she somehow was able to run away from there, whereas the truth is she cooperated with the Zamindar. Raman tries several times to get that diary, but fails. One day, Snehalatha confesses to him that she didn't show him because it has the truth that Rathnavadi Devi hadn't committed suicide, but was murdered. After hearing this, Raman stops trying to read the diary. A dispute arises between Velli and Snehalatha as Velli accuses Snehalatha of seducing his fiancée and separating him from her. During the dispute, Maruthamuththu, who is now under full control of Snehalatha, beats Velli. An aggrieved Velli goes away from there. The Village Kovil Festival starts and on a night where all the villagers are gathered to watch a "Villu Paattu" show about a village deity Neeli, Snehalatha and Maruthamuththu go away from there in the middle of the show. Noticing this, Velli, who thinks that they are going to be together, follows them after some time that they have gone. Noticing all these incidents, Raman remains until the show finishes. After the show finished, Raman goes to the Bungalow. In the Bungalow compound, Raman sees someone is lying on the floor leaning on a tree. He lights his torch and finds that is Snehalatha. He immediately calls the villagers and they find that she is dead. They also find a Voodoo Doll in her room. They inform Snehalatha's father about her death by  telegram. Meanwhile, Velli's father says that Velli is missing. People and police suspect that there may be any connection between the murder and the disappearance of Velli. So they search for Velli. At midnight, while Raman is sleeping, Velli comes to him admitting that she has killed Snehalatha by putting a rock on her. While Raman and Velli are having a conversation on this Police inspector, constables, Maruthamuththu and Thangarasu comes there to search the Bungalow for Velli. Deciding to help Velli, Raman tells Velli to hide in the secret door behind an old cupboard in his room. They search the whole Bungalow and find the secret room. But they do not find Velli and return. Raman gives Velli some bread to eat. Velli's little brother sees both of them through window and runs happily to tell Maruthamuththu that his sister is there.

Raman thinks for a solution and suddenly try to hug Velli. Velli gets shocked and injures Raman in his face. Raman says that he did like that in order to make the police and villagers believe that Velli has run away after injuring him. Velli feels sorry and grateful to Raman. Again Velli hides in the secret room. Police and villagers again come to the bungalow and Raman tells that Velli has injured him and ran away. Angry, Maruthamuththu disbelieves Raman, tries to fight with him. However, the inspector controls the situation and again all of them search for Velli in the secret room and the rest of the places, but this time also they find her nowhere. Left with no other option than believing in Raman's word, inspector tells him to inform if Velli comes again. After all of them return, Raman goes into the secret room to call Velli, but finds Velli is not there. He sees the broken window and understands Velli has jumped through the window. After some time, Velli returns to Raman covered by gold jewellery. She tells Raman that she hid in the well and there she found a box of gold jewellery. Raman also finds that Velli has not thrown a rock at Snehalatha, but a small stone given by the village clergy man in order to save Maruthamuththu from her control, which she believed that the stone had powers of Goddess Kali. Raman goes near the well with her and sees the box. He informs the Inspector about all. Also they get a return telegram from the son of the Zamindar stating that they have no daughter in the name of Snehalatha and all of their daughters are alive. However, Velli is taken under the custody under suspicion. Raman finds the diary that Snehalatha has been hiding from him and reads. It is the diary of Rathnavadi devi, in which she has written all the tortures given by Zamindar in order to take over her jewels given to her by her parents. And also she has left a clue on the diary that where all of her jewels have been hidden by keeping a Shenbagam flower in that particular page. After seeing the dried flower, Raman realises that the box of jewellery found in the well is Rathnavadi's as there is a Shenbagam tree near the well. He also realises that that Snehalatha should have come for this treasure and someone else is also there behind the scenes who has also killed Snehalatha. He reveals a plan to the inspector to catch the criminal. The next night they hide behind the trees near the well and see a man is coming. They immediately catch him and find that he is the Bioscope man who wanders in the village. (Seen as a small character in previous scenes) After getting caught, he admits that he has killed Snehalatha and reveals the reason. Actually, he is also a son of the Zamindar's through one of the Zamindar's mistresses. His mother was a stage drama artist, not treated well by the Zamindar and remained in poverty until she died. Before her death she has told his son to search for the treasure. He has got the help of his girl friend Snehalatha, a girl from the red light area. She has betrayed him after finding the jewels. On the night of Villu paattu, he accidentally kills Snehalatha during the dispute and ran away. Maruthamuththu also reveals that on the night of Villu paattu, they both came and searched for the box in the well and found it. But he never knew that there is jewels in the box and he has promised her to keep it as a secret.

Finally, the Bioscope man is arrested and the film ends with Raman returning to town, and Velli and Maruthamuththu is a happy couple again.

Cast 
Pratap Pothen as C. Kalyanaraman
Sripriya as Velli (a) Vellaiyamma
Sumalatha as Sneghalatha
Sundar Raj as Maruthamuthu
Manorama as Periyaatha
K. A. Thangavelu as Constable periyasamy
Pandu as Thangarasu
Kallapetti Singaram as Velli's father
Peeli Sivam as Inspector
Kula Deivam V. R. Rajagopal as Villupaatu singer
Master Haja Sheriff as Velli's brother
T. K. S. Natarajan as Villu Paatu singer
"Kambar" Jayaraman as Bioscope srinivasan

Production 
Ilaiyaraaja suggested to Sujatha the interesting idea of a thriller set in a rustic milieu, and Sujatha soon came up with a murder mystery against the backdrop of ancient folk songs and folklore. Prathap said he chose to do the film because of the story and character.

Soundtrack 
The music was composed by Ilaiyaraaja.

Reception 
Nalini Sastry of Kalki criticised Rangarajan's direction, Prathap's performance and felt Sripriya was miscast.

References

External links 
 

1980s Tamil-language films
1981 thriller films
Films based on Indian novels
Films directed by G. N. Rangarajan
Films scored by Ilaiyaraaja
Indian thriller films